Kasim Abid is an  Iraqi filmmaker, director, producer and cameraman.

Abid trained in Moscow as a cameraman before settling in London. 

Along with Maysoon Pachachi he co-founded the non-profit making ‘The Independent Film and TV College’ in Baghdad.

Filmography 

 Ghaib-Present and Absent 2021 Mirrors of Diaspora, 2018. Jury award at Muscat Int Film Festival - Special Mention - Oran Arab International Film Festival 2018 - Sardegna Palestina Award - Al Ard Film Festival 2019  Whispers of the Cities, 2013. Award: Special Mention – Cinema du Reel Film Festival.  Wings of the Soul, Special Mention Golf Film Festival - 2011 Life After The Fall, 2008. Best film - Munich International Documentary Film Festival. Golden Hawk - Arab Film Festival, Rotterdam. Best documentary film - Arab film festival California. Second best Documentary – Gulf film festival  Surda Checkpoint, 2005. Best Cinematography –Iraqi Short Film Festival.  Naji Al Ali: Artist With Vision, 1999. Audience Award - Arab Screen Independent Film Festival. Journalists Choice - Human Rights Film Festival Ramallah.   Amid the Alien Corn'', LeipzigFilm Festival 1990

Awards
2005 Alhambra Award for Excellence in Arts (The Muslim News Awards for Excellence)

References

External links 
Kasim Abid - www.kasimabid.com

Independent Film & TV College – Baghdad   www.iftvc.org

Documentary Film Festival – Baghdad   www.dffiq.com

Baghdad eye- Human Right Film Festival www.baghdadeye.org

Maysoon  Pachachi  www.oxymoronfilms.com

Living people
People from Baghdad
Iraqi Shia Muslims
British people of Iraqi descent
Iraqi documentary filmmakers
Iraqi documentary film directors
British Shia Muslims
Year of birth missing (living people)